Al-Muqaddamiyah Madrasa is a madrasah complex in Aleppo, Syria.

See also
 Al-Firdaws Madrasa
 Al-Sultaniyah Madrasa
 Al-Uthmaniyah Madrasa
 Al-Zahiriyah Madrasa
 Ancient City of Aleppo
 Khusruwiyah Mosque

References

Former churches in Syria
Former mosques
Former religious buildings and structures in Syria
Religious buildings and structures converted into mosques
Madrasas in Aleppo